This is a list of the youngest mayors in Canada. This list is inclusive of individuals nearest to the age of majority at the time of their election; usually under the age of 35. The people listed here are notable because of the rarity of their age category holding elected office of any type, particularly mayorships.

See also
 Youth politics
 Youth rights
 Youth voting
 Paradise, NL mayoral election controversy

References

External links
 Burkhard, P. (2007) "Municipal Elections and You", ApathyisBoring.com. July 19, 2007. Retrieved 4/14/08.

Canada mayors
Youth rights
 Youngest